Pass It On is the sixth studio album by Bryn Haworth.

Track listing
All tracks composed by Bryn Haworth
 "Pass It On"
 "Never Give Up On Love"
 "Come Away"
 "Think For Yourself"
 "Perfect Love"
 "The Cure"
 "Peace and Understanding"
 "Looking Through Different Eyes"
 "Come Over To My Place"
 "Fear God"

Personnel

 Henry Spinetti - drums
 Dave Markee - bass
 Pete Wingfield - piano, keyboards
 Bryn Haworth - guitar, vocals, Roland guitar synthesizer
 Steve Gregory - saxophone
 Peter Thomas - trombone
 Paul D'Oliveira - trumpet
 Dave Charles - congas, cabasa
 John David - back-up vocals
 Fran Byrne - drums
 Terry "Tex" Comer - bass
 Bam King - rhythm guitar

1984 albums
Bryn Haworth albums